Abdoulaye Ba (born 1 January 1991) is a Senegalese professional footballer who plays for Azerbaijani club Sabah FC as a central defender.

Club career
Born in Saint-Louis, Ba joined FC Porto's youth ranks in 2008, aged 17. He spent his first two seasons as a senior on loan to two other Portuguese clubs, S.C. Covilhã in the second division and Académica de Coimbra of the Primeira Liga, making his debut in the latter competition on 15 August 2011 in a 2–1 away win against U.D. Leiria and also playing the full 90 minutes against Sporting CP in that campaign's Taça de Portugal final, which ended 1–0 for the Students.

In September 2012, Porto bought back 25% of Ba's economic rights for €750,000 from investor "Pearl Design Holding Limited", with his value being estimated at €3 million at that time. He made his first league appearance for the Dragons on 2 November of that year, coming on as a substitute for injured Maicon in the first half of an eventual 5–0 home victory over C.S. Marítimo.

Ba was sent off for two bookable offences in the final of the Taça da Liga against S.C. Braga on 13 April 2013, the second of which also resulted in a penalty and the game's only goal, scored by Alan in the last minute of the first half. On 3 September, he moved to fellow league team Vitória S.C. for one year.

On 1 February 2014, Ba returned to Porto after appearing sparingly with the Minho Province side. On 4 August, he joined La Liga's Rayo Vallecano also in a temporary deal. In the following summer more of the same, as he moved to Fenerbahçe SK.

For 2016–17, Ba continued in the Turkish Süper Lig, joining Alanyaspor also on loan. After a spell at TSV 1860 Munich marred by injury problems, even though he was an automatic first choice when available, he returned to Rayo on 30 August 2017 after agreeing to a four-year contract.

Ba returned to the Spanish second tier on 11 March 2020, signing for Deportivo de La Coruña on a short loan due to Michele Somma's serious injury. On 8 October, he joined Romanian Liga I club FC Dinamo București on a one-year deal, leaving however after only two months.

International career
Ba represented Senegal at the 2012 Summer Olympics. He had won his first cap for the full side on 29 February of that year, in a 0–0 friendly draw with South Africa.

Personal life
Ba's older brothers, Mamadou and Pape Samba, were also footballers.

Honours
Académica
Taça de Portugal: 2011–12

Porto
Primeira Liga: 2012–13
Taça da Liga runner-up: 2012–13

Rayo Vallecano
Segunda División: 2017–18

References

External links

1991 births
Living people
Sportspeople from Saint-Louis, Senegal
Senegalese footballers
Association football defenders
Primeira Liga players
Liga Portugal 2 players
FC Porto players
S.C. Covilhã players
Associação Académica de Coimbra – O.A.F. players
FC Porto B players
Vitória S.C. players
Moreirense F.C. players
F.C. Arouca players
La Liga players
Segunda División players
Rayo Vallecano players
Deportivo de La Coruña players
Süper Lig players
Fenerbahçe S.K. footballers
Alanyaspor footballers
2. Bundesliga players
TSV 1860 Munich players
Liga I players
FC Dinamo București players
Azerbaijan Premier League players
Sabah FC (Azerbaijan) players
Senegal international footballers
Olympic footballers of Senegal
Footballers at the 2012 Summer Olympics
2011 CAF U-23 Championship players
Competitors at the 2015 African Games
African Games medalists in football
African Games gold medalists for Senegal
Senegalese expatriate footballers
Expatriate footballers in Portugal
Expatriate footballers in Spain
Expatriate footballers in Turkey
Expatriate footballers in Germany
Expatriate footballers in Romania
Expatriate footballers in Azerbaijan
Senegalese expatriate sportspeople in Portugal
Senegalese expatriate sportspeople in Spain
Senegalese expatriate sportspeople in Turkey
Senegalese expatriate sportspeople in Germany
Senegalese expatriate sportspeople in Romania
Senegalese expatriate sportspeople in Azerbaijan